Kentucky Blue Streak is a 1935 American film directed by Raymond K. Johnson and starring Edward J. Nugent, Frank Coghlan Jr. and Cornelius Keefe. The film's sets were designed by the art director Vin Taylor.

It was released in the United Kingdom under the alternative title The Blue Streak.

Synopsis
A financially-troubled Kentucky horseracing family is threatened with disgrace when the jockey brother agrees to throw a race in San Francisco and then gets mixed in a murder investigation. Meanwhile, his sister plans to enter her horse in the Kentucky Derby. Her brother escapes from jail in order to ride it to victory.

Cast 
Edward J. Nugent as Martin Marion
Frank Coghlan Jr. as Johnny Bradley
Patricia Scott as Mary Bradley
Cornelius Keefe as District Attorney Barton Pierce
Margaret Mann as Mrs. Martha Bradley
Roy D'Arcy as Harry Johnson
Ben Holmes as Bellhop O'Donnell
Roy Watson as Colonel Seymour
Harry Harvey as Barker/Voice of Radio Announcer
Roger Williams as Deputy
Joseph W. Girard as Warden Carlson
Walter Downing as Editor
Ben Carter as Waiter/Colored Octette leader
 Jack Cheatham as Cop at Race Track

References

Bibliography
 Pitts, Michael R. Poverty Row Studios, 1929-1940. McFarland & Company, 2005.

External links 

1935 films
1935 crime drama films
American horse racing films
American black-and-white films
American crime drama films
Films directed by Raymond K. Johnson
Films set in Kentucky
Films set in San Francisco
1930s English-language films
1930s American films